Stenoptilia stigmatoides is a moth of the family Pterophoridae. It is found in Slovakia and Hungary.

References

stigmatoides
Moths described in 1992
Plume moths of Europe